William G. Tracy (April 7, 1842 - December 8, 1924) was an American soldier awarded the Medal of Honor for actions during the American Civil War. The medal was awarded for actions as a Second Lieutenant at the Battle of Chancellorsville with the 122nd New York Infantry on 2 May, 1863. He was born in Syracuse, New York and died there in 1924.

Medal of Honor Citation 
Having been sent outside the lines to obtain certain information of great importance and having succeeded in his mission, was surprised upon his return by a large force of the enemy, regaining the Union lines only after greatly imperiling his life.

Date Issued: 2 May, 1895

References 

American Civil War recipients of the Medal of Honor
1842 births
1924 deaths
People from Syracuse, New York